Curse is the seventh studio album by English gothic rock band Alien Sex Fiend, released in September 1990 by Anagram Records.

Reception 

AllMusic wrote that the album is "just as invigorating, funny and flesh-crawling as always, though it's a much more technological ASF than ever before".

Track listing

References

External links 

 

Alien Sex Fiend albums
1990 albums